George Kay Stephenson (born December 17, 1944) is an American former college and professional football player and retired coach, whose latter career has seen him work in four different professional leagues.  Stephenson played quarterback for the American Football League's San Diego Chargers and Buffalo Bills.  He finished his playing career in 1974 in the World Football League with the Jacksonville Sharks before entering the coaching ranks.

Early life 

Stephenson was born in DeFuniak Springs, Florida in 1944, and grew up in nearby Pensacola.  He attended Pensacola High School, and he earned All-State accolades as a quarterback. He accepted an athletic scholarship to attend the University of Florida, where he played for coach Ray Graves from 1964 to 1966.  His arrival on the Florida campus coincided with that of another standout recruit, Steve Spurrier, who became the starting quarterback in 1964, and who won the Heisman Trophy in 1966. Stephenson remained a backup.

Stephenson graduated from Florida with a bachelor's degree in physical education in 1967.

Professional football coaching career 

After serving as a quarterbacks coach the previous season, Stephenson succeeded Chuck Knox as Buffalo Bills head coach on February 3, 1983.  Stephenson was reportedly surprised to get the job, claiming that Bills owner Ralph Wilson "never explained his reasons for selecting me."  Under Stephenson, the Bills went 8-8 in 1983, 2-14 in 1984, and after they lost their first four games in 1985, Stephenson was replaced by Hank Bullough.  Perhaps the most lasting impression that Stephenson left on the Bills was changing their helmet color from white to red prior to the 1984 season, insisting that the change would aid Buffalo quarterbacks in finding receivers downfield. At the time, three of the Bills' four division rivals, the New England Patriots, Indianapolis Colts, and Miami Dolphins, wore white helmets.  The gambit didn't work as interceptions actually increased the subsequent season.

Stephenson also coached in the World League where he led the Sacramento Surge to the 1992 World Bowl championship, and in the Canadian Football League he coached the San Antonio Texans and the Edmonton Eskimos.

Head coaching record

NFL

WLAF

CFL

See also 

 List of American Football League players
 List of Buffalo Bills head coaches
 List of Buffalo Bills players
 List of University of Florida alumni

References

1944 births
Living people
American football quarterbacks
American Football League players
Arkansas Razorbacks football coaches
Buffalo Bills players
Buffalo Bills coaches
Buffalo Bills head coaches
Edmonton Elks coaches
Florida Gators football players
Los Angeles Rams coaches
Rice Owls football coaches
Sacramento Gold Miners
Sacramento Surge coaches
San Antonio Texans coaches
San Diego Chargers players
Jacksonville Sharks (WFL) players
Sportspeople from Pensacola, Florida
People from DeFuniak Springs, Florida
Players of American football from Pensacola, Florida